In music, Op. 121 stands for Opus number 121. Compositions that are assigned this number include:

 Brahms – Vier ernste Gesänge
 Fauré – String Quartet
 Schumann – Violin Sonata No. 2